Jeon Bo-ram (born March 22, 1986), referred to as Boram, is a South Korean singer and actress. She originally debuted as a solo artist, releasing two singles in 2008, before eventually becoming a member of girl group T-ara in 2009. The group went on to become one of the best-selling girl groups of all time.

Boram has been involved in multiple acting projects, notably dramas Soul (2009), musicals I Really Really Like You (2009) and Lost Garden (2014), which became a hit in South Korea selling out all tickets.

Early life
Jeon Bo-ram was born on March 22, 1986, in Seoul, South Korea. Her father is Jeon Young-rok, who was a hugely popular singer in South Korea in the 1970s and 1980s. Her mother is Lee Mi-young, a well-known actress. She is a third-generation artist in Korea as both her grandfather, Hwang Hae, and grandmother, Baek Sul-hee, were both singers. Her younger sister, Jeon Woo-ram, is a member of D-Unit, under the stage name Ram.

Career

2008–2013: Career beginnings

Boram released two single albums which consisted of four singles prior to her debut in T-ara. Her debut digital single "Is It Today" was released on April 15, 2008 in a single album titled "Lucifer Project Vol 1. 愛". On November 14, 2008, she released her second digital single titled "From Memory", along with two other singles.  

Boram was contacted by the CEO of Core Contents Media after he watched a video clip of her dancing to BoA's "My Name". In mid-2009, Boram was the first member to join T-ara after two members, Jiae and Jiwon, left the group.

In 2010, she was cast as a lead in a one-episode drama special of KBS's The Angel Of Death Comes With Purple High Heels. The drama recorded 5,1% in viewership, a 2,2% increase from the previous drama, and became the second highest rated drama of the year.

It was announced on July 15, 2010, that she would take over Eunjung's position as the second leader of T-ara, following the addition of new member Hwayoung.

In December 2010, she was cast in the musical I Really Really Like You along with her father. Boram passed on her leadership to fellow member Hyomin in July 2011.

2013–2016: QBS and The Lost Garden 

Boram along with Qri and Soyeon formed a subgroup called QBS in May 2013. The subgroup focused on the Japanese market. They released their debut single titled "Kaze no You ni" (風のように, Like the Wind) on June 26, 2013.

In 2014, Jeon starred in the musical adaptation of Oscar Wilde's The Selfish Giant as Mercy, a global project featuring a team from five nations. It ran from January 17, 2014 to February 16 at Yongin Poeun Art Hall in Yongin, Gyeonggi. The musical was a commercial success and sold out every showing, selling more than 11,000 tickets just two weeks into its staging. The musical was previously a hit in Shanghai, China selling over 20,000 tickets after three performances. The musical also made its festival debut at the 9th Daegu International Musical Festival; the oldest musical festival and the only one in Asia.

2017–present: Departure from MBK Entertainment
On March 6, 2017, MBK Entertainment (formerly known as Core Contents Media) announced that T-ara would be releasing their last album as a six-member group in May, after Boram and Soyeon decided not to renew their contracts, and other members decided to stay with the label until December 31, 2017. On May 7, MBK Entertainment revealed the group's plans had changed and that the group would disband following the release of the album and that the final album had been rescheduled to release in June 2017, with Boram and Soyeon not participating due to the expiry of their contracts. On May 8, it was announced that T-ara's last performance as six-members would be in a Taiwan concert on May 13.

In September 2019, Boram was cast in ‘Modern Family’ of MBN along with her mother. She also starred youth drama Shall We That's in 2019.

Discography

Filmography

Film

Television series

Web series

Variety shows

Music video appearances

Musical

Advertisements

Endorsements 
Prior to her debut as a singer, Boram worked as a magazine model and served as a muse for various cosmetic brands including Luna Cosmetics. She also appeared as a model for The National Public Relations Agency.

In 2010, Boram filmed a CF for Cass beer alongside 2PM.

Awards and nominations

Listicles

References

External links

 
 
 

1986 births
K-pop singers
South Korean women pop singers
South Korean television actresses
South Korean female idols
Living people
T-ara members
MBK Entertainment artists
Musicians from Seoul
Actresses from Seoul